Leo Cornelio S.V.D. (born 14 March 1945) is an Indian prelate of the Catholic Church who was Archbishop of Bhopal from 2007 to 2021. He was bishop of Khandwa from 1999 to 2007.

Biography 
Leo Cornelio was born in Kallianpur, Udupi, on 14 March 1945. At the age of thirteen he joined the Divine Word Missionaries (SVD). He completed his minor seminary studies at  Rajeshwar Vidhyalaya, in Mhow, Madhya Pradesh from 1958 to 1962. He studied with the SVD for two years and then spent two years in their novitiate. He completed his studies in philosophy in 1968 and theology in 1972 at the Papal Athenaeum, Pune.

He was ordained a priest on 14 November 1972 and began working at Gyan Ashram in Mumbai. He obtained his Master's degree in English literature from the State University. He also completed a course in theology and spirituality in Rome in 1983. In 1984, he was elected to a three-year term as provincial superior of the SVD's Central Indian province based in Indore, and he was elected to a second term in 1987. He was elected a general councilor of the order at its general chapter held in Rome in June 1988.

He was appointed Bishop of Khandwa by Pope John Paul II on 3 June 1999 and received his episcopal consecration on 8 September 1999.

On 17 February 2001, Pope John Paul named him a member of the Pontifical Council for the Pastoral Care of Migrants and Itinerant People.

He was appointed Archbishop of Bhopal by Pope Benedict XVI on 15 June 2007 and installed there on 16 September 2007.

Pope Francis accepted his resignation on 4 October 2021.

References

External links

1945 births
Living people
Christian clergy from Karnataka
21st-century Roman Catholic archbishops in India
Bishops appointed by Pope John Paul II